The European green toad (Bufotes viridis) is a species of toad found in steppes, mountainous areas, semi-deserts, urban areas and other habitats in mainland Europe, ranging from far eastern France and Denmark to the Balkans and Western Russia. As historically defined, the species ranged east through the Middle East and Central Asia to western China, Mongolia and northwestern India, and south through Italy and the Mediterranean islands to North Africa. Following genetic and morphological reviews, 14 population (all largely or entirely Asian, except for the African and Balearic green toads) are now regarded as separate species. These species and the European green toad are placed in their own genus Bufotes, but they were included in Bufo.

Description

The spots on the back vary from green to dark brown and sometimes red spots appear, too. The underside is white or very lightly coloured. The European green toad will change colour in response to heat and light changes. Females are larger than males and can lay 9,000 to 15,000 eggs at a time.

Diet
Bufotes viridis eats a variety of insects and invertebrates, mainly crickets, meal worms, small butterflies, earthworms, moths, beetles, ants, spiders and caterpillars. There has also been a reported attack on a bat.

References

Further reading
Laurenti JN (1768). Specimen medicum, exhibens synopsin reptilium emendatam cum experimentis circa venena et antidota reptilium austriacorum. Vienna: "Joan. Thom. Nob. de Trattnern". 214 pp. + Plates I-V. (Bufo viridis, new species, p. 27 + Plate I, figure 1). (in Latin).

External links

Bufotes
Fauna of Croatia
Amphibians of Europe
Amphibians described in 1768
Taxa named by Josephus Nicolaus Laurenti